The 2012 Regions Morgan Keegan Championships and the Memphis International was an ATP World Tour and WTA Tour event held at the hardcourts of the Racquet Club of Memphis in Memphis, Tennessee, US. It was the 37th edition of the Regions Morgan Keegan Championships and the 27th edition of the Memphis WTA International Event. The Regions Morgan Keegan Championships was part of the ATP World Tour 500 series on the 2012 ATP World Tour, and the Cellular South Cup was an International-level tournament on the 2012 WTA Tour. The event took place from February 17 to February 26, 2012. Jürgen Melzer and Sofia Arvidsson won the singles titles.

ATP singles main draw entrants

Seeds

1 Rankings as of February 13, 2012

Other entrants
The following players received wildcards into the main draw:
 Ryan Harrison
 Sam Querrey
 Jack Sock

The following players received entry from the qualifying draw:
 Robby Ginepri
 Robert Kendrick
 Jesse Levine
 Bobby Reynolds

ATP doubles main draw entrants

Seeds

1 Rankings are as of February 13, 2012

Other entrants
The following pairs received wildcards into the doubles main draw:
  Ryan Harrison /  Denis Kudla
  Ryan Sweeting /  Bernard Tomic

WTA singles main draw entrants

Seeds

1 Rankings as of February 13, 2012

Other entrants
The following players received wildcards into the main draw:
  Lauren Davis
  Madison Keys
  Melanie Oudin

The following players received entry from the qualifying draw:
  Camila Giorgi
  Alexa Glatch
  Jamie Hampton
  Irena Pavlovic

WTA doubles main draw entrants

Seeds

1 Rankings are as of February 13, 2012

Other entrants
The following pairs received wildcards into the doubles main draw:
  Lauren Davis /  Madison Keys
  Alyssa Hibberd /  Tiffany Welcher
The following pair received entry as alternates:
  Stefanie Mikesz /  Mariya Slupska

Withdrawals
  Alexa Glatch (left Achilles tendon injury)

Retirements
  Ksenia Pervak (viral illness)
  Nadia Petrova (left thigh injury)

Finals

Men's singles

 Jürgen Melzer defeated  Milos Raonic, 7–5, 7–6(4)

Women's singles

 Sofia Arvidsson defeated  Marina Erakovic, 6–3, 6–4
 This was Arvidsson's second WTA title, with her first title won at the same event six years ago.

Men's doubles

 Max Mirnyi /  Daniel Nestor defeated  Ivan Dodig /  Marcelo Melo, 4–6, 7–5, [10–7]

Women's doubles

 Andrea Hlaváčková /  Lucie Hradecká defeated  Vera Dushevina /  Olga Govortsova, 6–3, 6–4

Sources 
 ATP Singles draw
 ATP Doubles draw
 WTA Draws

External links
 Official site

 
Regions Morgan Keegan Championships
Cellular South Cup
Regions Morgan Keegan Championships and the Cellular South Cupl
Regions Morgan Keegan Championships and the Cellular South Cup
Regions Morgan Keegan Championships and the Cellular South Cup